Vadstena Municipality (Vadstena kommun) is a municipality in Östergötland County in southeast Sweden. Its seat is located in the city of Vadstena.

The old City of Vadstena was during the nationwide local government reform of the 1970s merged into Motala Municipality in 1974. This "marriage" was unsuccessful and a "divorce" was soon agreed upon and in 1980 the present municipality was created. It contains, however, 12 original units.

Nature
Vadstena is situated by lake Vättern, Sweden's second largest lake. Fishing was an important source of food when the town was first founded around the year 1000 AD, and it continued to be dependent on fish and ship merchandise.

There are two nature reserves in the municipality:
The Ombergsliden, 230,000 m2 large, a lime-rich marsh. It has several notable plants, such as the uncommon orchid Tuber geophyte (Gymnadenia odoratissima), and the carnivorous Butterwort plant .
The Kastad kulle torräng is a drumlin rich on lime, and hosts several plants otherwise not found in the area, such as the Oxytropis pilosa, otherwise very sparsely outside of Gotland .

Sights
Vadstena Castle
Vadstena Abbey
The Vadstena Hospital area and museum with buildings from the 16th century to the 20th century.
Herrestad Church, inaugurated in 1112, which makes it one of the oldest dated stone churches in Sweden (the Holy Cross Church in Dalby, Skåne, Sweden was built "around" 1060). The church tower was constructed around a century later, and is largely unmodified throughout the centuries.
Rogslösa Church, from the 13th century, which is especially notable for its ornaments of Celtic influences.
There are also other interesting medieval churches in the municipality, such as Hagebyhöga Church, Väversunda Church, Hov Church, Örberga Church and Nässja Church. Most of these were begun on in the 12th century.

References

External links

Vadstena Municipality - Official site
Tidernas Landskap - For current events

Municipalities of Östergötland County